The Danish Chancellery was an administrative and partially governmental body in Denmark from the 12th century to 1848.

History

Before the Reformation
From the 12th century to the Reformation in 1536 its name was simply the Chancellery. The chancellor was appointed by the king from among bishops. It had the responsibility of the expedition of letters and orders from the king. Later it also gained the responsibility of copying and archiving the king's regulations.

From the Reformation to the introduction of absolute monarchy
After the Reformation the Chancellery was renamed Danish Chancellery to distinguish it from the German Chancellery. The Danish Chancellery was responsible for all correspondence in Danish and the civil administration of Denmark, Norway and Sweden. The German Chancellery had similar responsibility for the German and Latin correspondence and the civil administration of duchies of Schleswig and Holstein. Before, 1770, when it was separated into its own ministry, the German Chancellery was also responsible for foreign policy towards all but the Nordic countries.

The chancellor was now a noble and not a clergyman.

Over the years the chancellery gained a strong governmental power in additional to its administrative responsibilities.

First mentioned in 1550s Rentekammeret (lit. Rent Chamber) was a part of the Danish Chancellery. It had the responsibility of the state financial administration. Under and after Christian IV the central administration grew rapidly. Bureaus such as a postal service and customs where created.

Under absolute monarchy

At the introduction of absolute monarchy in Denmark, a number of equivalent administration and governing bodies was introduced including the War Chancellery, and Kommercekollegiet. Rentekammeret was elevated and renamed to Skatkammerkollegiet.

Chancellors

Kongens Kansler

Danske Kansler

See also
 Rentekammeret

References

External links
 Biographies of Kansler office holders

Government of Denmark